From the Czech Mills is a 1925 Czechoslovak comedy film directed by Svatopluk Innemann.

Cast
Ferry Seidl as Šebestián Šafránek
Filip Balek-Brodský as Florián Karásek / Vodník
Božena Svobodová as Mrs. Karásková
Bohumil Kovář as Priest
Zdena Kavková as Anička
Jiří Plachý as Karel Karásek
Vladimír Řepa as Tonda Kolenatý
Antonín Frič as Old miller
Luigi Hofman as Landowner
Nora Ferry as Julinka, landowner's daughter
Milka Balek-Brodská as Aunt Filomena
Hugo Haas as Baron Zachariáš Zlámaný

References

External links 
 

1925 films
1925 comedy films
Czechoslovak black-and-white films
Czech silent films
Czechoslovak comedy films